The 1981 Indiana Hoosiers football team represented the Indiana Hoosiers in the 1981 Big Ten Conference football season. They participated as members of the Big Ten Conference. The Hoosiers played their home games at Memorial Stadium in Bloomington, Indiana. The team was coached by Lee Corso, in his ninth year as head coach of the Hoosiers.

Several Indiana players ranked among the Big Ten leaders, including the following:
 Quarterback Babe Laufenberg ranked third in the conference with a 57.1% pass completion percentage, fifth with 1,788 passing yards, and sixth with a 118.5 passing efficiency rating. 
 Wide receiver Duane Gunn led the conference with an average of 21.2 yards per reception and 27.3 yards per kickoff return and sixth with 656 receiving yards.
 Marc Longshore ranked fifth in the conference with four interceptions.

Schedule

Roster
WR Duane Gunn
QB Babe Laufenberg, Jr.

Season summary

Purdue
Doug Smith kicked the go-ahead 39-yard field goal with 8:30 left in the game and Indiana's defense stopped two ensuing Purdue drives with interceptions to preserve the victory.

References

Indiana
Indiana Hoosiers football seasons
Indiana Hoosiers football